The Music of Chance (1990) is an absurdist novel by Paul Auster. It was a 1991 finalist for the PEN/Faulkner Award for Fiction and was later made into a film in 1993; Mandy Patinkin played Nashe and James Spader played Pozzi.

Plot summary
Jim Nashe is a fireman with a two-year-old daughter and wife who has just left him. Knowing he cannot work and raise a child at the same time, he sends her to live with his sister. Six months of sporadic visits pass and Nashe realizes that his daughter, Juliet, has begun to forget him. Suddenly, the father that abandoned Nashe as a child dies, leaving his children a large amount of money. Nashe, knowing that Juliet will be happier with her aunt, pays off all of his debts, buys a Saab and pursues "a life of freedom" by spending a year driving back and forth across the country.

His fortune now squandered, Nashe picks up a hot-headed young gambler named Jack Pozzi. The two hatch a plan to fleece a couple of wealthy bachelors named Flower and Stone in a poker game. In addition to purchasing a mansion, the two eccentrics also bought ten thousand stones, from the ruins of a fifteenth-century Irish castle destroyed by Oliver Cromwell; Flower and Stone intend to use them to build a "Wailing Wall" in the meadow behind their mansion.

Flower and Stone are not the suckers Pozzi takes them for and the plan backfires. Having run out of money Nashe decides to risk everything on "a single blind turn of a card" and puts up his car as collateral against the pot.  He loses and the two indenture themselves to Flower and Stone as a way to pay back their debt. They will build the wall for Flower and Stone, a meaningless wall that nobody will ever see. For the rest of the novel, Flower and Stone are conspicuously absent. Nashe shrugs this off as fifty days of exercise, but Pozzi views it as nothing less than a violation of human decency.

The two men are watched over by Calvin Murks, the millionaires' tough but amiable hired man. When Pozzi takes a swing at Murks for cracking a joke about being too smart to play cards, Murks begins wearing a gun. Pozzi sees this as proof that he is nothing but a slave.

Even after the two men have completed working off their debt, the millionaires add on the food and entertainment charges the men have accrued as a result of living at the estate. Pozzi, convinced there is no way out of the contract, escapes the meadow. Days later Nashe finds his young friend sprawled on the grass beaten into a coma.  Murks claims innocence and tells Nashe he took Pozzi to a hospital. Two weeks later, Murks tells Nashe that Pozzi checked himself out of the hospital and vanished, but Nashe is convinced that his friend is dead.

Time passes, the wall grows as does Nashe's obsession with taking revenge on Murks. When Nashe has completed enough work on the wall to pay off his debt, Murks and his son-in-law Floyd take Nashe out to celebrate. Nashe beats Floyd in a game of pool, but refuses the fifty dollars he has won; Floyd accepts this, saying that he owes Nashe a favor. Soon after, the three men pile into Murks's new car (Nashe's old Saab) with the slightly more sober Nashe behind the wheel. Nashe promptly takes the car up to eighty-five miles an hour and deliberately collides, head-on into an oncoming vehicle.

Influence
The Music of Chance was referred to in David Mitchell's 1999 novel Ghostwritten, which also deals with the nature of random chance. In the novel, one character is a member of a musical collective called The Music of Chance, named "after a novel by that New York bloke".

Dialogue from the film adaptation is used in a track by Sweet Billy Pilgrim called 'Here It Begins'.

Adaptations 
In 2009, Audible.com produced an audio version of The Music of Chance, narrated by Marc Vietor, as part of its Modern Vanguard line of audiobooks.

References

External links
Music of Chance, Movie Trailer

Novels by Paul Auster
1990 American novels
American novels adapted into films
Viking Press books
PEN/Faulkner Award for Fiction-winning works